Season 3 of Fast N' Loud premiered on June 10, 2013, as Richard Rawlings and mechanical prodigy Aaron Kaufman once again search for classic cars. This season they conjure up a plan to transform a vintage '71 Dodge Scat Pack Challenger bought at auction. Their grand scheme turns into a mechanical challenge that Aaron and his team have never seen the likes of before. Meanwhile, Richard invests in a new live venue space across from the Grill and is nervous he's going to have to spend every last dollar he has to do it. The mechanics also bring back to life a '57 Shorty School bus.

Episodes

References 

2013 American television seasons
2014 American television seasons